The Anthony and Louise Viaer Alumni Hall, formerly the Administration Building, is a building on the campus of Huston–Tillotson University in Austin, Texas, United States.

Constructed in 1914 in the Prairie School style, it was built of bricks manufactured by Huston–Tillotson students.

The building was named after Anthony E. Viaer, an alumnus of the Class of 1958 who gave a $1 million scholarship opportunity to university students.

The building was first nominated for National Register listing in 1986, but was not then listed, due to owner objection.  It was listed in 1993.

References

Huston–Tillotson University
National Register of Historic Places in Austin, Texas
Buildings and structures in Austin, Texas
Prairie School architecture in Texas
Buildings and structures completed in 1914
University and college buildings on the National Register of Historic Places in Texas
University and college academic buildings in the United States